The 2022–23 Liga MX season  (known as the Liga BBVA MX for sponsorship reasons) is the 76th professional season of the top-flight football league in Mexico. The season will be divided into two championships—the Apertura 2022 and the Clausura 2023—each in an identical format and each contested by the same eighteen teams. 

With the 2022 FIFA World Cup commencing on 20 November, the Apertura 2022 second leg final was on 30 October.

Stadiums and locations
The Estadio Azteca will be closed from 2023 to 2025 due to renovations for the 2026 FIFA World Cup. Although the project was anticipated to begin in the winter of 2023, the renovations were postponed for the summer of 2023.

Personnel and kits

Managerial changes

Torneo Apertura
The Apertura 2022 was the first tournament of the season. The tournament began on 1 July. The defending champions were Atlas.

Standings

Positions by Round

Results 
Teams played every other team once (either at home or away), completing a total of 17 rounds.

Regular Season statistics

Top goalscorers 
Players sorted first by goals scored, then by last name.

Source: Liga MX

Top assists

Source: Soccerway

Clean sheets

Hat-tricks 

(H) – Home ; (A) – Away

Scoring 
  First goal of the season:  Israel Reyes for Puebla against Mazatlán (1 July 2022)
  Last goal of the season:  Alfonso Alvarado for León against Tijuana (2 October 2022)

Discipline 

Player
 Most yellow cards: 9
 Fernando Gorriarán (Santos Laguna)

 Most red cards: 3
 Nicolás Díaz (Tijuana)

Team
 Most yellow cards: 48
 Puebla

 Most red cards: 8
 UANL
 Fewest yellow cards: 28
 América

 Fewest red cards: 0
 América
 Monterrey

Source: Liga MX

Attendance

Per team

|h=65461|l=5668|a=|pr=16907|source=Liga MX|notes=Only regular season listed.Querétaro's stats are not included in the "League total" average attendance number.1: As a result of the riot on 5 March 2022, Querétaro will play all matches behind closed doors for one year. The ban began on 7 March 2022.|date=June 2022}}

Highest and lowest

Source: Liga MX

Final phase – Apertura 2022

Reclassification

Bracket

Quarter-finals

Semi-finals

Finals

Torneo Clausura
The Clausura tournament began on 6 January and will end on 28 May 2023. The defending champions are Pachuca.

Standings

Positions by Round

Results 
Teams will play every other team once (either at home or away), completing a total of 17 rounds.

Regular Season statistics

Top goalscorers 
Players sorted first by goals scored, then by last name.

Source: Liga MX

Top assists

Source: Soccerway

Clean sheets

Hat-tricks 

(H) – Home ; (A) – Away

Scoring 
  First goal of the season:  Juan Manuel Sanabria for Atlético San Luis  against Necaxa (6 January 2023)

Discipline 
Player
 Most yellow cards: 6
 Luis Rodríguez (Juárez)

 Most red cards: 2
 Paul Bellón (León)

Team
 Most yellow cards: 35
 Necaxa

 Most red cards: 6
 UNAM

 Fewest yellow cards: 15
 Pachuca

 Fewest red cards: 0
 América
 Atlas
 Monterrey
 Toluca

Source: Liga MX

Attendance

Per team

|h=48788|l=8819|a=|pr=20533|source=Liga MX|notes=Only regular season listed.Querétaro's stats for the first four home matches (all played behind closed doors) are not included in the "League total" average attendance number.1: As a result of the riot on 5 March 2022, Querétaro played all matches behind closed doors for one year. On 3 March 2023, the league announced that the ban would be lifted on 19 March 2023.|date=June 2022}}

Highest and lowest

Source: Liga MX

Coefficient table
As of the 2020–21 season, the promotion and relegation between Liga MX and Liga de Expansión MX (formerly known as Ascenso MX) was suspended, however, the coefficient table will be used to establish the payment of fines that will be used for the development of the clubs of the silver circuit. 

Per Article 24 of the competition regulations, the payment of $MXN160 million will be distributed among the last three positioned in the coefficient table as follows: 80 million in the last place; 47 million the penultimate; and 33 million will be paid by the sixteenth team in the table, as of the 2021–22 season the remaining  $MXN80 million will be paid through the financial remnants generated by the Liga MX itself. The team that finishes last on the table will start the following season with a coefficient of zero.  If the last ranked team, which was Juárez, repeats as the last ranked team in the 2022–23 season coefficient table, they will be fined an additional $MXN20 million.

 Rules for fine payment: 1) Fine coefficient; 2) Goal difference; 3) Number of goals scored; 4) Head-to-head results between tied teams; 5) Number of goals scored away; 6) Fair Play points
 F = Team will have to pay fine indicated
Source: Liga MX

Aggregate tables

CONCACAF Champions League
The league champion with more points at the end of the Apertura 2022 and Clausura 2023 seasons will qualify directly to the 2024 CONCACAF Champions League round of 16. The league champion with less points at the end of the season will qualify for the 2024 CONCACAF Champions League first round. The Apertura runner-up, Clausura runner-up, and the next two best ranked teams will also qualify for the 2024 CONCACAF Champions League first round.

Leagues Cup
The league champion with the highest aggregate points accumulated across the Clausura 2022 and Apertura 2022 seasons will qualify directly to the 2023 Leagues Cup round of 32. Liga MX clubs ranked 2 to 16 in the aggregate table will be in the second position in each group, opposite the MLS Supporter's Shield table (for example, the best remaining team in the Supporter's Shield table not earning a bye is drawn against the lowest-best team remaining in the Liga MX 2022 aggregate table). The remaining 13 MLS clubs, along with the two remaining Liga MX clubs, will be drawn into groups and divided geographically.

See also 
2022–23 Liga de Expansión MX season
2022–23 Liga MX Femenil season
2022 Copa Sky

References

Liga MX
Liga MX seasons
Liga MX
Mexico